The Department of State Development was a department of the Government of Western Australia. The department was formed on 1 January 2009, out of the former Department of Industry and Resources and Department of Consumer and Employment Protection, which were split into three new departments, the Department of State Development, the Department of Mines and Petroleum and the Department of Commerce.

On 1 July 2017, the department was amalgamated with the industry promotion and innovation functions sub-departments of the Department of Commerce and the Western Australian Tourism Commission to form the Department of Jobs, Tourism, Science and Innovation.

References

External links
 Government of Western Australia website
 Department of State Development

State
Western Australia
2009 establishments in Australia
Government agencies established in 2009
2017 disestablishments in Australia
Government agencies disestablished in 2017